Skrunda Parish is an administrative unit of Kuldīga Municipality in the Courland region of Latvia.

Villages of Skrunda parish 

 Bračas
 Ciecere
 Jaunmuiža
 Kušaiņi
 Niedre
 Plostnieki
 Pumpuri
 Rūnaiši
 Savenieki
 Vēršmuiža
 Videnieki

Parishes of Latvia
Kuldīga Municipality
Courland